The GLAAD Media Award for Outstanding Comedy Series is an annual award that honors comedy series for excellence in the depiction of LGBT (lesbian, gay, bisexual, and transgender) characters and themes. It is one of several categories of the annual GLAAD Media Awards, which are presented by GLAAD—an American non-governmental media monitoring organization founded in 1985, formerly called the Gay & Lesbian Alliance Against Defamation—at ceremonies in New York City; Los Angeles; and San Francisco between March and June.

The award is one of the few to have been present at every ceremony since the 1st GLAAD Media Awards in 1990, where the CBS series Doctor Doctor won. For the 7th GLAAD Media Awards in 1996, the category was merged with Outstanding Drama Series to create Outstanding Television Series, but this was reverted the following year. Throughout the award's history, there have only been two instances where a tie occurred: in 1995 where NBC's Friends and ABC's Roseanne won, and again in 2011 with Fox's Glee and ABC's Modern Family winning. Animated series, such as Steven Universe and Harley Quinn, have also been nominated.

For a comedy series to be eligible, it must include at least one LGBT character in a leading, supporting, or recurring capacity. The award may be accepted by the show's producers, writers, and/or actors. Comedy series selected by GLAAD are evaluated based on four criteria: "Fair, Accurate, and Inclusive Representations" of the LGBT community, "Boldness and Originality" of the project, significant "Impact" on mainstream culture, and "Overall Quality" of the project. GLAAD monitors mainstream media to identify which comedy series will be nominated, while also issuing a Call for Entries that encourages media outlets to submit programs for consideration. Comedic programs created by and for an LGBT audience must be submitted in order to be considered for nomination, as GLAAD does not monitor such works for defamation. Winners are determined by a plurality vote by GLAAD staff and board, Shareholders Circle members, as well as volunteers and affiliated individuals.

Since its inception, the award has been given to 20 comedy series. With seven wins out of nine nominations, five of which were consecutive, Will & Grace has received the award more than any other program. Both Roseanne and Transparent have won the award three times, while Doctor Doctor, Glee, Modern Family, Schitt's Creek, and Ugly Betty have won twice. With four nominations, Superstore is most nominated series without a win. The most recent recipient is Peacock's Saved by the Bell, which was honored at the 33rd GLAAD Media Awards in 2021.

Winners and nominees

1990s

2000s

2010s

2020s

Multiple wins and nominations

Programs

The following programs received two or more Outstanding Comedy Series awards:

The following programs received four or more Outstanding Comedy Series nominations:

Networks

The following networks received two or more Outstanding Comedy Series awards:

The following networks received four or more Outstanding Drama Series nominations:

Notes

References

External links
 GLAAD Media Awards

Comedy Series